Riccardo Meili (born 6 March 1982) is a footballer from Switzerland who last plays as goalkeeper for FC Vaduz in the Swiss Challenge League.

Soccer Career 
Meili started his career at SC Aadorf in 1999. He made 22 appearances for the club during the 2 seasons he was there. He then signed for FC Frauenfeld in 2001 and played 19 times for the club before leaving for FC Basel during the January transfer window. He was at Basel from 2001 to 2003 as second and third-choice goalkeeper and he become for the first time swiss champion with FC Basel. His hunger for first-team football then led him across the city to FC Concordia Basel where he played 19 games in 2 years. After Concordia he had a short spell at FC Wil 1900, playing 2 games. Meili went back to FC Basel in 2005 where he once again saw no first-team action which led to him leaving for FC Concordia Basel for a second time, where he played 40 games in 2 years. In 2008, he joined Panionios F.C., an Athens-based club in Greece, where he signed a three year contract. After leaving the club in February 2009, he signed on 20 June 2009 a contract with FC Vaduz and left the club on 30 June 2009 and he stopped his soccer career.

Business career 

In 2009 he started his private banking career at Credit Suisse, Switzerland's second biggest bank, where he stayed till April 2015. 

In May 2015 he opened together with his Wife, Zahra Eram, Switzerland's most exclusive dental clinic called Eram Dental Health Clinc. After 7 years he expanded the business and opened in September 2022 the most exclusive orofacial clinic, The Eram Clinic.

Personal 
He is married to Zahra Eram, who together with her he founded worlds leading orofacial clinic, The Eram Clinic in Zurich, Switzerland. Together they have two kids. 

Meili and his family reside mainly in Zurich, Switzerland.

References

1982 births
Living people
Swiss men's footballers
Spanish footballers
Swiss people of Spanish descent
FC Basel players
FC Concordia Basel players
FC Wil players
Panionios F.C. players
Association football goalkeepers
Place of birth missing (living people)
FC Frauenfeld players
Sportspeople from Thurgau